Copestylum fornax is a species of syrphid fly in the family Syrphidae.

References

Further reading

External links

 

Eristalinae
Articles created by Qbugbot
Insects described in 1895